Bileh Savar County is in Ardabil province, Iran. The capital of the county is the city of Bileh Savar. At the 2006 census, the county's population was 54,471 in 11,700 households. The following census in 2011 counted 53,768 people in 14,019 households. At the 2016 census, the county's population was 51,404 in 15,114 households.

The county also contains a border crossing between Azerbaijan and Iran. According to the Tehran Times border crossings increased through 2019 and are primarily related to exchanges with the predominantly Azerbaijani city of Ardabil in Ardabil Province.

Administrative divisions

The population history of Bileh Savar County's administrative divisions over three consecutive censuses is shown in the following table. The latest census shows two districts, four rural districts, and two cities.

References

 

Counties of Ardabil Province